is a 26-episode Japanese animated TV series that aired from 19 October 1985 to 26 April 1986. The series takes place in a fairy tale and science fiction setting and follows the protagonist Button Nose as she finds out she is descended from royalty. It was the first TV series produced by Sanrio.

Background 

The Button Nose character was originally designed by Masayo Hirose (広瀬昌代) for Sanrio, and introduced in 1978. Sanrio's character profiles portray Button Nose as a sweet and lively girl, who makes strawberry jam and likes cookies. She is called Button Nose because her nose is small and round.

In 1983 Sanrio built a strawberry shaped store based on the fictional home of Button Nose. Located in Tokyo, the store was originally planned to be in place for a limited time, but due to positive customer response it remained in operation until 2011.

Production 
Button Nose was animated by Pacific Animation Corporation and was the first TV series produced by Sanrio.

The animation production of the series was completed in 1983, but the actual broadcast date was two years later.

An English dub was produced by Saban in 1994.

Characters 
 Button Nose
 The only daughter of a strawberry farmer on earth. She should just hand over the strawberries to Ticktackbon at the request of Fastener, but due to her curiosity she follows herself and she goes to Hookland of the planet Calint. She is actually the niece of Duke Fastener in the Hookland royal family, and she has an adventure to cure Fastener's illness, so she decides to become Queen of Hookland.

 Franklin
 An aardvark and a pet of Button Nose.

 Ticktackbon
 A servant robot made by Fastener. He manages the human time of the castle and can be annoying because he is noisy, but without him the castle will not have function.

 Duke Fastener
 Although his title is Duke, he is actually the king of Hookland and the uncle of Button Nose. He has been interested in space for a long time and asks Button Nose to act for the Queen and goes on a space trip.

 Prince Flower
 The only son of Fastener. He enjoys to making bread. However, making bread makes very often fails. He is timid but smart because he is a reader, and his knowledge often helps Button Nose.

 Chamberlain
 He is often swayed by the actions of Button Nose. He is a childhood friend of Fastener and Martha, the mother of Clip, and is often adventurous as a child.

 Clip
 A bad boy of a downtown cleaning shop. He has a bad mouth, and for better or worse, he has a fluttering relationship with Button Nose and Prince Flower. He rides a motorcycle around and is responsible for putting Button Nose and Flower in the event of an incident.

 Mrs. Bracelet
 Countess of Hookland. She intends to kick out Button Nose and marry Pierce to Flower to take over the country, but she's just failing.

 Pierce
 Daughter of Mrs. Bracelet. Like her mother, she has a twisted personality, is hostile to Button Nose, and does a lot of bad things. She has a cat called Soil. Even if Button Nose once helps her, she will give back her favor, which is a lump and she takes an unexpected behavior in the final episode.

 Vongole Bianco
 The older brother of the "Vongole Brothers" who lives in the city. The pattern on his hat is white. They hangs with Mrs. Bracelet and her child and does bad things, but sometimes they tries to outsmart each other.

 Vongole Rosso
 The younger brother of the "Vongole Brothers". The pattern on his hat is red. He is weak and at the mercy of Bianco.

Voice Cast

References

External links

 

1985 anime television series debuts
Japanese children's animated fantasy television series
Topcraft